"You" is a song by American recording artist Janet Jackson from her sixth studio album, The Velvet Rope (1997). It was released as the album's fifth single on September 28, 1998 in the United Kingdom.

Song information
A trip hop-flavored song, "You" contains a sample from War's 1972 hit song "The Cisco Kid", penned by Harold Brown, Sylvester Allen, Morris Dickerson, Howard Scott, Leroy Jordan, Lee Oskar, and Charles Miller.

Responding to Qs suggestion that backing vocals on The Velvet Rope sounded like her brother, Jackson said: "You're the second or third person that's said that. It's not him, though. You know what? When we did 'You', I thought the ad-libs sounded too much like him, so I re-did them. But I guess I didn't make them sound different enough."

Although the single received a promo release in the United Kingdom, it was ineligible to chart there.

Jackson has performed the song on The Velvet Rope Tour and on her 2019 Vegas residency, Janet Jackson: Metamorphosis.

Music video
The music video for the song was directed by David Mallet and shot at the SECC Arena in Glasgow, Scotland on June 2, 1998 in front of a select group of fans. Made to look like a live performance, it is spliced with actual concert footage of Jackson's The Velvet Rope Tour, filmed at the same location the next day. The footage contains highlights from the entire show, including the moment when Janet pulled 16-year-old Wilson Kelvin McQuade on stage and did a lap dance for him during the song "Rope Burn". The video appears on the DVD edition of 2001's All for You and on the 2004 DVD From Janet to Damita Jo: The Videos.

Track listings
European promo CD single (EU VSCDJ 1713)
"You" (single edit) – 3:56
"You" (album version) – 4:42

Japanese CD single (VJCP12116)
"You" (album version) – 4:42
"Every Time" (Jam & Lewis Disco Mix) – 4:16
"Accept Me" – 4:07

US video single (J-JVIYO231025)
"You" (short version) (video) – 4:13

Official remixes
 Album version – 4:42
 Album instrumental – 4:46
 Single edit – 3:56
 Short version – 4:13

Release history

References

1997 songs
1998 singles
Janet Jackson songs
Songs written by Janet Jackson
Songs written by Jimmy Jam and Terry Lewis
Song recordings produced by Jimmy Jam and Terry Lewis
Trip hop songs
Music videos directed by David Mallet (director)